Jiuzhan railway station is a railway station of Changchun–Tumen Railway. The station is located in the Changyi District of Jilin, Jilin province, China.

See also
Changchun–Tumen Railway

References

Railway stations in Jilin